Viktor Barvitius (March 28, 1834 – June 9, 1902) was a Czech painter, influenced primarily by Realism and late Impressionism.

Life and work
In 1864 he graduated from the Prague Academy. His graduate work was a picture of the Battle of Crecy. From 1865 to 1868 lived in Paris, where he studied under Thomas Couture. In 1860 he returned to Bohemia, then devoted himself to genre painting. He died in Prague, aged 68.

His older brother was the architect Antonín Viktor Barvitius (1823–1901).

Notable works include a portrait of Adolf Kosárek (1853), Čtvrtek ve Stromovce (Thursday in Stromovka) (1860), Slavnost ve Hvězdě (Festival of the Stars), Place de la Concorde (1866) and another version of Čtvrtek ve Stromovce (1885).

Gallery

References

External links

1834 births
1902 deaths
Artists from Prague
Academy of Fine Arts, Prague alumni
19th-century Czech painters
Czech male painters
19th-century Czech male artists